Made in Italy is a merchandise mark indicating that a product is all planned, manufactured and packed in Italy.

Made in Italy may also refer to:
 Made in Italy (1965 film), an Italian anthology comedy film
 Made in Italy (2020 film), an American comedy drama film
 Made in Italy (album), by Luciano Ligabue (2016)